Crni Lug may refer to the following villages:

 Crni Lug, Croatia, in Primorje-Gorski Kotar County
 Crni Lug, Vranje, Serbia
 , Bosnia and Herzegovina
 Carallukë (Crni Lug) near Istog, Kosovo